Valery Valentinovich Polienko (born October 17, 1974, Taganrog, Soviet Union) is a Russian director, poet, composer and producer.

Author and co-author of lyrics for bands t.A.T.u. (Ya Soshla S Uma, Nas Ne Dogonyat, A Simple Motion, Ne Ver', Ne Boysia and others) and Zveri. Screenwriter and director of commercials and music videos.

References

External links 

 Cosmosfilm.ru
  Afisha.ircity.ru 

1974 births
Living people
Musicians from Taganrog
Russian male poets
Russian songwriters
Russian composers
Russian male composers
Russian record producers
Russian film directors
T.A.T.u.
Writers from Taganrog